Douglas Joseph Cardinal  (born 7 March 1934) is a Canadian architect based in Ottawa, Ontario. His flowing architecture marked with smooth curvilinear forms is influenced by his Indigenous heritage as well as European Expressionist architecture. His passion for unconventional forms and appreciation of nature and landscape were present in his life from a very young age, and consequently developed into the unique architectural style he has employed throughout his career. Cardinal is perhaps best known for his designs of the Canadian Museum of History in Gatineau, Quebec (1989) and the National Museum of the American Indian in Washington, D.C. (1998). He is considered one of Canada's most influential contemporary Indigenous architects.

Life
Born in Calgary, Alberta, to parents Joseph and Frances Cardinal, Douglas Cardinal is the oldest of eight children. His father was of Siksika (Blackfoot), French and Ojibwe heritage, while his mother was of German, French and Mohawk/Métis descent. His mother worked as a nurse and was well educated. Cardinal's parents met in 1926, and in the first half of the 20th century women had very little status and rights. The patriarchal society did not recognize educated women like Frances Cardinal. However, his father's tribe's societal norms accepted a matrilineal culture, where women are very respected and admired. These cultural ideas shaped Cardinal's upbringing and affected his worldview and relationship with his heritage. He has recalled that his mother told him at a young age, “You’re going to be an architect.”
 
Cardinal grew up a couple of miles outside the small city of Red Deer, Alberta. Cardinal was educated at  St. Joseph's Convent Catholic, a boarding school for children who lived in the country and wanted to go beyond the 8th grade, which was all that most one-room country schools offered. Cardinal finished high school there. The much-loved Daughters of Wisdom who ran the boarding school taught both Catholic and Protestant children there, and like many other boarders, Cardinal was taught about arts and culture by the Sisters. He has said that this religious school influenced him immensely. Living a few miles away from the rest of his family made him focus on his academic achievements. Traditional sacred architecture and its role in culture made him want to create spaces as powerful and inspirational as churches and basilicas. It also ignited in him a passion for architecture in those early years.

In 1953, he started studying architecture at the University of British Columbia (UBC) but was forced to leave two years later due to his radical ideas. His different approach toward architecture did not align with the ideas of modernism at the time. He wanted to create buildings responding to nature and the organic rhythm of life, which was unprecedented in the 1950s. In his third year of studies, he was told by the director of UBC that he had "a wrong background" for the program and the profession. After he left Vancouver and returned to Red Deer to start working at local architectural firms as a draftsman. His ejection from UBC made it impossible for him to apply to Canadian universities again. Cardinal also wanted a change of scenery due to racism towards Indigenous people in his home country so decided to head south, stopping in Arizona and Mexico, and later settling in Texas. Eventually, he attended the University of Texas at Austin, from which he graduated with a degree in Architecture in 1963.

In university, he also studied cultural anthropology, due to his cultural heritage and philosophy based on the sacredness of life and nature. He wanted to study people and did not feel that the buildings around him were designed around people. His philosophy was inspired by architect Rudolph Steiner, with whom Douglas studied at University of Texas. Steiner's work led Douglas to study anthropomorphism, which he applied to his work. The idea of anthropomorphism and its concept of responding to human behavior, natural cycles of life and the beauty of sacred land and tectonics aligned with Cardinal's cultural heritage. Another inspiration for Cardinal were works of Frank Lloyd Wright. He appreciated his organic way of responding to the landscape with the use of natural materials, such as stone and brick. In Texas, he accepted his Indigenous heritage and one of his professors even encouraged him to learn more about his background.

Career
Cardinal opened his private practice in 1964, and the same year he was commissioned to design St. Mary's Church in Red Deer, Alberta. Construction was completed in 1968, and it has since been recognized as a prominent example in the history of Canadian architecture. In 2007, the church was featured on a Canada Post stamp series featuring four Canadian architects to commemorate the centennial of the Royal Architectural Institute of Canada (RAIC).

Beginning with his work on St. Mary's, Cardinal was one of the first North American architects to use computers to assist in the design process. His curvilinear designs reflect the landscape around them, so that people making use of the building can retain a sense of the surrounding land. He found that the use of computerized design would fit best for his unusual designs and the use of shapes. He also found 3D programs very useful for laying out the exact dimensions of buildings.

In 1993, he was hired by the Smithsonian Institution as the Primary Design Architect for the National Museum of the American Indian (NMAI). The NMAI is currently situated on the National Mall in Washington, D.C., and is directly across from the Capitol of the United States of America. After contractual disputes, Cardinal was removed from the project in 1998 before it was completed, but he continued to provide input into the building's design.

In 2008, his firm was hired by the Kirkland Foundation to design a museum/convention center in Union City, Tenn.  The Discovery Park of America was to be a unique structure housing a multi level museum with artifacts from across the nation as well as provide a place for large conventions/meetings for the community.  Early in 2009 the firm's contract was terminated with the owner, and all construction activity was halted, due to undisclosed differences between the two parties.

Architectural style and philosophy 
Throughout his early years, Douglas Cardinal was dealing with racism and societal ideas of conformity for both his lifestyle and architecture. Only in his years in Texas he started to fully embrace his indigenous heritage and learn more about it. In 1970s Cardinal developed his trademark architectural style with organic curvilinear forms. In those years he started wearing native clothes and necklaces, as well as becoming an advocate for indigenous rights. This spiritual connection with his native culture affected and influenced his work and unique architectural approach. Many philosophical ideas of indigenous history include its respect and sensibility towards nature, humans' inseparable relationship with the environment and land. These concepts resulted in his use of natural materials, organic shapes, soil and sun studies, as well as creating spaces that move people spiritually and make them appreciative of their surroundings. The native philosophy is also very contrasting from the Western civilization worldview due to its use of time. It is appreciative of resilience of nature and its ability to withstand hard conditions. Therefore, its architecture aims to last for seven generations, as opposed to the economically driven and efficient approach of the patriachial society.

St. Mary's Church 
St. Mary's Church in Red Deer, Alberta is Cardinal's first building. Upon his return to Alberta, Cardinal met with Father Werner Merx, who wanted the new church to be innovative and unique. The archbishop of the church has already appointed another architect for the job, but Merx insisted on hiring Cardinal and realizing his vision. The archbishop whom they needed to convince turned out to be Anthony Jordan, who helped to resolve legal case for Cardinal 10 years earlier. Douglas Cardinal was approved for a job.

The church has 750 seats inside and includes tubular skylights for natural daylight. Cardinal started his first project in 1967 and it turned out to be so challenging that he doubted if he could survive its completion. However, the building became one of his iconic designs that determined his architectural style. He combined all of his philosophical and cultural ideas and created a church that represented his many beliefs towards the nature and organic forms, that is unique and unprecedented for its time.

Canadian Museum of History 
This building, opened in 1989 as Canadian Museum of Civilization at the time, is another project that is very representative of Cardinal's architectural style. Influenced by his indigenous heritage it focuses on the response to its surroundings. It is located on the banks of the Ottawa River, facing Parliament Hill. All the massive government buildings in the city center are clustered and turned away from the river. Cardinal opened the Great Hall towards the river, making it the only building in the area that is responding to it. This approach also translated into the wrapping facade with curves that can embrace and invite people inside and create welcoming environment. The envelope of the building is shaped in an organic form, as if sculptured by the forces of nature. He also wanted to acknowledge his appreciation for the Parliament by using the same limestone as the one used in the building. Besides responding to the site conditions, the museum also engages with its historic context by including totem poles and native murals inside the building. He wanted the space inside feel alive and dynamic, and not limit its form to the programmatic requirements. Former Canadian prime minister Pierre Trudeau also encouraged Cardinal to create a museum where people embrace their different backgrounds and learn from each other. Prime minister's idea for multicultural Canadian society aligned well with Cardinal's vision. The overall concept and purpose of the building corresponded with his ideas. However, in 1984 the new Brian Mulroney government was not approving of Cardinal's design. He then lost his team on the project and was not fully paid for his previous work. This was a tremendous loss for the architect, but he was too driven to fulfill this project and was not willing to give up. After long years of defending his design, he eventually finished the museum and it became one of his many fundamental projects.

The Group of Seven 
In 20th century, there were several artistic hierarchies, such as Canadian Group of Seven. Cardinal was part of a similar group that included some of Canada's most influential architects, such as Moshe Safdie, Raymond Moriyama, Eberhard Zeidler, Arthur Erickson, Ray Affleck and Ron Thom. This environment was encouraging for the architect and they often shared ideas and passion to create great architecture. Although all of their styles and conceptual vision were different, they all agreed on creating with meaning and beauty, instead of commercial skyscrapers of that era. However, his personal and financial problems often made him lose his direction and consequently he did not receive as much recognition as his peers. These instances include his design of the Grand Prairie Regional College in Alberta. Opened in 1974, this project did not meet government's simplistic and modernistic vision for the project and went over budget.

Works

Among the many projects Cardinal has completed in his career are the following:
 St. Mary's Church (1968) Red Deer, Alberta
 Diamond Jenness Secondary School (1972) Hay River, Northwest Territories
 Fairview Elementary School (1975) Red Deer, Alberta
 Alberta Government Services (Provincial) Building (1976) Ponoka, Alberta
 Grande Prairie Regional College (1976) Grande Prairie, Alberta
 Precam Elementary School (1976) La Ronge, Saskatchewan
 St. Albert Place & City Hall (1976) St. Albert, Alberta
 Grotski Residence (1978) Edmonton, Alberta
 Spruce Grove City Hall (1981) in Spruce Grove, Alberta
 Spruce Grove Composite High School (1982) Spruce Grove, Alberta
 Cardinal Residence (1982) Stony Plain, Alberta
 Edmonton Space And Science Centre (1984) Coronation Park, Edmonton, Alberta, which has since been renovated and rebranded as the Telus World of Science 
 Leighton Artist Colony, at the Banff Centre (1985) Banff, Alberta
 Sioux Valley (1986) Sioux Valley, Manitoba
 Canadian Museum of History (1989) in Gatineau, Quebec, opposite Parliament Hill 
 Jehovah's Witnesses Kingdom Hall (1991) Gatineau, Quebec
 York Region Administrative Centre (1992) in Newmarket, Ontario
 Kanai Middle School (1996) Sioux Valley, Manitoba
 National Museum of the American Indian (1993–1998) Washington
 Circle of Life Thunderbird Place (2001) Winnipeg, Manitoba
 First Nations University (2003) in Regina, Saskatchewan
 Me-No-Ya Win Health Centre (2010) Sioux lookout, Ontario
 Wabano Centre (2013) Ottawa, Ontario
 Gordon Oakes Red Bear Centre (2016) at the University of Saskatchewan in Saskatoon, Saskatchewan
 Unceded: Voices of the Land Exhibition (2018) at the Venice Biennale
 Adelante Healthcare Goodyear Project (2018) Mesa, Arizona
 Long Point First Nation, Winneway, Quebec
 Iskotew Healing Lodge, Ottawa, Ontario
 Bonneville Rehabilitation Centre, Bonnyville, Alberta
 Ojigkwanong Students Centre, Carleton University, Ottawa, Ontario
 Ile a la Crosse Elementary School, Île-à-la-Crosse, Saskatchewan
 Cardinal Studio Sudbury, Ontario
 Ouje' Bougoumou Village, Ouje' Bougoumou, Quebec
 Janvier Gallery, Cold Lake, Alberta
 Grand Traverse Civic Centre, Grand Traverse County, Michigan, USA

Achievements

Writings 

 Of the Spirit, NeWest Press (Edmonton, Alberta, Canada), 1977.
 (With Trevor Boddy) The Architecture of Douglas Cardinal, NeWest Press (Edmonton, Alberta, Canada), 1989.
 (With Jeanette C. Armstrong) The Native Creative Process, Theytus Books, 1994.

Awards 
In 2005 Cardinal was awarded The Distinguished Artist Award from the Lieutenant Governor of Alberta for “creating an indigenous style of Canadian architecture, characterized by gracious organic forms, which continually challenged the most advanced engineering standards.

 Honor award, Alberta Association of Architects, 1968;
 Honor award, City of Red Deer, Alberta, 1969;
 Award of Excellence, City of Red Deer, Alberta, 1978;
 Award of Excellence, Canadian Architect, 1972;
 Member, Royal Canadian Academy of Arts, 1974;
 Achievement of Excellence Award in Architecture, Province of Alberta, 1974;
 Fellow, Royal Architectural Institute of Canada, 1983;
 Banff Centre National Arts Award, 1990;
 Canada Council Molson Prize for the Arts, 1993;
 Aboriginal Achievement Award, 1995;
 RAIC Gold Medal for Architectural Achievement, 1999;
 Royal Architectural Institute of Canada, Millennium Celebration of Architecture, St. Mary’s Church, Alberta, 2000;
 Juan Torres Higueras Award, Federation of Pan American Associations of Architects, 2000;
 Governor General’s Award in Visual and Media Arts, Ottawa, Ontario, 2001;
 Best Building Award, Grand Traverse Centre, United Contractor of America, 2002;
 United Nations Award for Sustainable Design, Oujé-Bougoumou Village, Quebec, 2002;
 Golden Jubilee Medal in honor of Her Majesty The Queen’s 50th Anniversary, Ottawa, Ontario, 2002;
 “Douglas J. Cardinal Performing Arts Centre” opens in GRPC, Grand Prairie, Alberta, 2004;
 Laureate, Canada Council of the Arts, 2004;
 Presidential Award, Masonry Design Awards, First Nations University, 2005;
 Lieutenant Governor of Alberta Excellence in the Arts Award, Banff, Alberta, 2005;
 Outstanding Professional Achievement Award, American Society of Landscape Architects, 2006;
 “World Master of Contemporary Architecture” by the IAA, Sofia, Bulgaria, 2006;
 Outstanding Professional Achievement Award, American Society of Landscape Architects, 2006;
 Canada Post postage stamp - Douglas Cardinal and St. Mary's Church - commemorating RAIC's 100th Anniversary, 2007;
 IAA Grand Prix Crystal Globe, 2009;
 St. Albert Place and City Hall declared ‘Municipal Historic Resource’, 2009;
 Gold Medal of the Union of Architects of Russia, Moscow, Russia, 2009;
 Best Public Services Development in Canada Meno-Ya-Win Health Centre, International Property Awards, Essex, United Kingdom, 2009;
 Alberta Masonry Design “Lifetime Achievement” Award, 2010;
 Wood WORKS! “Northern Ontario Excellence” Award for Sioux Lookout Meno-Ya-Win Health Centre, 2011;
 Ontario Wood Works “Northern Ontario Excellence Award” for Meno-Ya-Win Health Centre, 2012;
 RAIC-NSAA Le Prix du XXe siècle for Grand Prairie Regional College, 2013;
 Presidential Award from the Saskatchewan Masonry Institute for Gordon Oaks Red Bear Student Center in Saskatoon, Saskatchewan, 2016;

Personal life 
Cardinal has been married four times and has eight children. After his return to Red Deer, Douglas Cardinal met his former high school sweetheart Deirdre. Her Irish Catholic family did not accept of their relationship because of his heritage and the two of them eloped. This also was a problem, because Cardinal had charges pressed against him as an interracial marriage was illegal at the time. He was defended by the archbishop lawyer Anthony Jordan and was not found guilty. Deirdre then was pressured to move back with her family, and was raising their first daughter alone.

Shortly before he decided to go the United States, he started a relationship with Carole Olson. She accompanied him on a road trip 1957 to Texas and they later got married. They had three children - Nancy, Guy and Bret. The couple split during their years in America due to his preoccupation with work. His son Bret is also an architect and has worked with his father for 25 years until he started his own architecture firm.

He married Marylin Zahar in 1973, with whom he had two children - Lisa and Jean-Marc. 

His fourth and current wife, Idoia Arana-Beobide, is of Basque origin and 30 years his junior. The two met in 1988 when his designs for the Canadian Museum of History were being constructed. At the time, she was a tour guide for the museum and an international student taking a museum studies course at a local community college. Together they have two children and reside in Ottawa. His wife works as a director at his architectural firm.

References

Bibliography 
Hall, J. (July 14, 2014). The Outsider: How Douglas Cardinal Draws Genius from Native Roots. Toronto, ON: Toronto Newspapers Limited. .

Douglas Cardinal. (2018). The Canadian Architect, 63(2), 30–32.

Douglas Joseph Cardinal. (2016). Gale Literature: Contemporary Authors, Gale. Gale Literature Resource Center.

Cardinal, D. J. (1998). Architecture as a living process. Canadian Journal of Native Education, 22(1), 3.

Liscombe, R.  (2003). Cardinal, Douglas. Grove Art Online. Retrieved on 2020-03-30 from https://www.oxfordartonline.com/groveart/view/10.1093/gao/9781884446054.001.0001/oao-9781884446054-e-7000014003.

External links
Architect's web site
Canada Council 2001 Governor General's Award for Visual and Media Arts
Washington Post
Douglas Cardinal Archiving Project
History Museum of Canada

1934 births
Living people
Artists from Calgary
Blackfoot people
Canadian people of French descent
Canadian people of German descent
Canadian people of Métis descent
Canadian architects
Officers of the Order of Canada
Expressionist architects
First Nations artists
Governor General's Award in Visual and Media Arts winners
Indspire Awards
National Museum of the American Indian